Blennerhassett Island Historical State Park is a state park located on Blennerhassett Island, a small island in the Ohio River, located in Wood County, West Virginia, USA.  The property was the site of a Palladian mansion owned by Harman Blennerhassett, a participant in some of the alleged intrigues of Aaron Burr, and his wife Margaret Agnew.  While the original mansion burned to the ground in 1811, a detailed replica, which can be toured, was built on its foundations in the 1980s. The Blennerhasset mansion greatly resembled George Washington's Mount Vernon, due to its Palladian style.

The park is accessed via sternwheeler riverboat from Point Park on 2nd Street in Parkersburg, West Virginia.  The riverboat ride takes about 20 minutes each way.

Blennerhasset Museum of Regional History
The Blennerhasset Museum of Regional History operates in conjunction with the state park.  The Museum is located two blocks from the riverboat landing at the corner of 2nd and Juliana Streets.  Exhibits focus on the regional history of west and central West Virginia, and include household furnishings, art, clothing, and prehistoric Native American tools, jewelry, weapons and items.  Admission is separate from the park.

Features
 Horsedrawn carriage rides
 Restored 1802 Putnam-Houser House
 Gift shop
 Picnic shelters
 Bicycle rentals
 Hiking

Accessibility

West Virginia University assessed the park's accessibility to the disabled in 2005, and rated its facilities as "accessible" by the standards of the Americans with Disabilities Act.

See also

Blennerhassett Island Bridge
List of West Virginia state parks

References

External links
 Official website for state park
 Official website for visitors' info/amenities
Cajoe Phillips, a former slave of the Blennerhassett Island Plantation

History of West Virginia
Ohio River
State parks of West Virginia
Protected areas of Wood County, West Virginia
Historic house museums in West Virginia
Houses on the National Register of Historic Places in West Virginia
Historic districts in Wood County, West Virginia
History museums in West Virginia
Blennerhassett Island
Museums in Wood County, West Virginia
Georgian architecture in West Virginia
Palladian Revival architecture in West Virginia
Parks on the National Register of Historic Places in West Virginia
National Register of Historic Places in Wood County, West Virginia
Plantation houses in West Virginia
Houses in Wood County, West Virginia
Rebuilt buildings and structures in West Virginia
Historic districts on the National Register of Historic Places in West Virginia